Kawazu Sukeyasu (河津 祐泰, died October 1176) was a Japanese samurai lord and the head of a noble clan (gōzoku) in Izu Province during the late Heian period. He was the eldest son of Itō Sukechika descending from the Kudō clan. He was the father of Soga Sukenari and Tokimune, who are known for the Revenge of the Soga Brothers incident, a revenge for the murder of Sukeyasu.

Life 
Sukeyasu inherited the Kawazu Manor from his father, Itō Sukechika, and took the family name Kawazu from it. At the time, there was a dispute over the Itō Manor in Izu Province within the Kudō clan. The manor was ultimately inherited by his relative Kudō Suketsune.  Dissatisfied with this, Sukeyasu took over the Itō Manor while Suketsune was in Kyoto. Sukeyasu also made his daughter, Mangō Gozen, who was married to Suketsune, divorce him.

Suketsune held a deep grudge and ordered the assassination of Sukeyasu. In October 1176, a group of assassins attacked Sukechika and Sukeyasu, who were hunting in Okuno, Izu Province. The arrow shot at Sukechika missed and hit Sukeyasu instead, killing him.

At the time of Sukeyasu's death, his two young sons, Sukenari and Tokimune were four and two years old, respectively. Sukeyasu's widowed wife remarried, to Soga Sukenobu, who became her sons' stepfather. On June 28, 1193, during the hunting event known as the Fuji no Makigari, Sukenari and Tokimune avenged their father and killed Suketsune. This incident became known as the Revenge of the Soga Brothers.

Family 

 Father: Itō Sukechika
 Siblings:
 Brother: Itō Sukekiyo
 Sister: Mangō Gozen (Kudō Suketsune's first wife, Dohi Tōhira's wife)
 Sister: Hōjō Tokimasa's first wife
 Sister: Miura Yoshizumi's wife
 Sister: Yaehime

 Wife: Yokoyama Tokishige's daughter
 Eldest son: Soga Sukenari
 Second son: Soga Tokimune
Son: Hara Kojirō
Son: Risshi

See also 

 Revenge of the Soga Brothers
 Kawazu gake

References 

People of Heian-period Japan
Samurai
12th-century Japanese people
1176 deaths
Year of birth unknown